Talang 2023 is the thirteenth season of Swedish Talang and is broadcast on TV4 from 14 January. The host remains Pär Lernström, and the new jury consists of Helena Bergström, Viktor Norén, Johanna Nordström and David Batra. Edward af Sillén, Sarah Dawn Finer and Bianca Ingrosso quit the show as a jury after season twelve.

Auditions Summary
 |  |  Golden Buzzer

Audition episode 1 (January 13) 

At the end of the episode, the jury had to choose two of the five contestants that the majority of the jury had accepted to advance to the semi-finals. They chose Gneben and Jennifer.

Audition episode 2 (January 20) 

At the end of the episode, the jury had to choose two of the five contestants that the majority of the jury had accepted to advance to the semi-finals. They chose Florian and let the public decide which of Paulina & Alvin and David gets the other semi-final spot. At the beginning of the following episode, it was revealed that the public chose Paulina & Alvin.

Audition episode 3 (January 27) 

At the end of the episode, the jury had to choose two of the four contestants that the majority of the jury had accepted to advance to the semi-finals. They chose Chatte & Anto and The Carling Sisters.

Audition episode 4 (February 3) 

At the end of the episode, the jury had to choose two of the four contestants that the majority of the jury had accepted to advance to the semi-finals. They chose Kuba Dancecompany and Pontus Lindman.

Audition episode 5 (February 10) 

At the end of the episode, the jury had to choose two of the five contestants that the majority of the jury had accepted to advance to the semi-finals. They chose Abe and let the public decide which of Gullis and Rydm Crew gets the other semi-final spot. At the beginning of the following episode, it was revealed that the public chose Gullis.

Audition episode 6 (February 17) 

At the end of the episode, the jury had to choose two of the four contestants that the majority of the jury had accepted to advance to the semi-finals. They chose Ludvig & Rasmus and Samet Yüce.

Audition episode 7 (February 24) 

At the end of the episode, the jury had to choose two of the five contestants that the majority of the jury had accepted to advance to the semi-finals. They chose Madelene & Helena and Uppsala Dansakademi.

Semi-final Summary
 |  |

Semi-final 1 (March 3)

Semi-final 2 (March 10)

References 

Talang (Swedish TV series)